The 1995–96 Alpha Ethniki was the 60th season of the highest football league of Greece. The season began on 26 August 1995 and ended on 29 May 1996. Panathinaikos won their second consecutive and 18th Greek title.

Teams

Stadia and personnel

 1 On final match day of the season, played on 29 May 1996.

League table

Results

Top scorers

External links
Official Greek FA Site
RSSSF
Greek SuperLeague official Site
SuperLeague Statistics
 

Alpha Ethniki seasons
Greece
1